La Gazette d'Israël is a Tunisian francophonic newspaper for the Jewish community, founded in October 1938 by E. Ganem in Tunis. Its editor-in-chief was Henri Emmanuel.

History

Context 
The weekly newspaper was created mainly to create an opposing political force against the conservative and nationalist journals Le Réveil Juif and Kadima that dominated the Jewish media sphere at that time.

It is considered as an organ of the revisionist Zionist system in Tunisia that until the end of World War II was not really interested in the question of the Aliyah and the holy land, while focusing manly on local issues such as the learning of Hebrew within the Tunisian community, the socio-economic situation of the Jewish district in the medina of Tunis, or the rights of the Jewish people as Tunisian citizens.

The last issue of La Gazette d'Israël was published in 1951.

Directors 
The journal was managed by:
 David Boccara
 Raymond Cohen
 Victor Haouzi
 André Scemmama

La Gazette d'Israël in numbers 
Depending on the issue, the journal's number of pages varied between two and four.

Between 1938 (year of creation) and July 1939, 2000 copies were printed. Between December 1945 and September 1951, 15000 copies were published.

See also 
La Justice
Le Réveil Juif

References 

Defunct newspapers published in Tunisia
French-language newspapers published in Tunisia
1938 establishments in Tunisia
Publications established in 1938
1951 disestablishments in Africa
Publications disestablished in 1951
1950s disestablishments in Tunisia
Jewish newspapers
Jews and Judaism in Tunis
Revisionist Zionism
Zionism in Tunisia